Out Loud is the first studio album by Boom Boom Satellites, originally released on R&S Records in 1998. It peaked at number 45 on the UK Independent Albums Chart. 
Two of the tracks on the album, "Scatterin' Monkey" and "4 A Moment of Silence", were featured on the soundtrack for the 2008 superhero film The Dark Knight.

Track listing

Personnel
Credits adapted from liner notes.
 Michiyuki Kawashima – guitar, vocals
 Masayuki Nakano – bass guitar, programming
 Naoki Hirai – additional drums
 Kouji Sekiguchi – turntables (2)
 Issei Igarashi – trumpet (2, 6)
 Nao Takeuchi – saxophone (2, 6), flute (2, 6)
 Asuka Strings – strings (10)
 Asuka Kaneko – string arrangement (10)

Charts

References

External links
 
 

1998 albums
Boom Boom Satellites albums
R&S Records albums
Epic Records albums
Sony Music Entertainment Japan albums